Mike Maker may refer to:

 Michael J. Maker (born 1969), American trainer of Thoroughbred racehorses
 Mike Maker (basketball) (born 1965), American college basketball coach